Lethe distans , the scarce red  forester, is a species of Satyrinae butterfly found in the  Indomalayan realm where it is  found in Bhutan, Sikkim, Assam to Burma and  Thailand

References

distans
Butterflies of Asia
Butterflies of Indochina